Bermanella marisrubri is a heterotrophic, strictly aerobic and motile bacterium from the genus of Bermanella which has been isolated from seawater from the Gulf of Eilat from the Red Sea in Israel.

References

Oceanospirillales
Bacteria described in 2009